Iris Apatow (born October 12, 2002) is an American actress and socialite. She portrayed Arya Hopkins in the Netflix series Love and Krystal Kris in the 2022 Netflix film  The Bubble.

She is the youngest daughter of filmmaker Judd Apatow and actress Leslie Mann. Her older sister is Euphoria actress Maude Apatow.

Early life 
Iris Apatow was born on October 12 2002 to actress Leslie Mann and filmmaker Judd Apatow. Her sister is fellow actress Maude Apatow, who she worked with on This is 40, Funny People, and Knocked Up. She graduated high school in 2021.

Career 
Apatow began acting at the age of 5, when she appeared as Charlotte in the film Knocked Up, which was directed by her father, Judd Apatow.

In 2016, Apatow appeared on the Netflix series Love as Arya Hopkins, the young star of a TV series.

Personal life 
As of March 2022, Apatow has been dating Ryder Robinson, son of actress Kate Hudson and singer Chris Robinson.

Her personal relationships with celebrities including "best friend" singer-songwriter Olivia Rodrigo, as well as influencers Charli D'Amelio and Avani Gregg have received much media attention.

Filmography

Film

Television

References

External links

2002 births
Living people
21st-century American actresses
American child actresses
American film actresses
American people of Finnish descent
American people of Jewish descent
American socialites
American television actresses
Film child actresses